Pimelea flava is a species of flowering plant in the family Thymelaeaceae and is endemic to south-eastern Australia. It is a shrub with narrowly elliptic to egg-shaped leaves arranged in opposite pairs, and compact clusters of 9 or more flowers with 2 or 4 elliptic to circular involucral bracts at the base. The flowers and bracts are white or yellow, depending on subspecies.

Description
Each flower is either male or female, hairy, yellow or white, depending on subspecies. Flowering mainly occurs from August to December.

Taxonomy
The species was first formally described in 1810 by Robert Brown in his Prodromus Florae Novae Hollandiae. The specific epithet (flava) means "yellow".

In 1847, Diederich Franz Leonhard von Schlechtendal described Pimelea dichotoma in the journal Linnaea, but in 1983, Threlfall reduced it to Pimelea flava subsp. dichotoma in the journal Brunonia. That name, and that of the autonym are accepted by the Australian Plant Census:
 Pimelea flava subsp. dichotoma (Schltdl.) Threlfall, commonly known as diosma rice-flower, usually grows to a height of  has green involucral bracts and white flowers. 
 'Pimelea flava R.Br. subsp. flava commonly known as yellow rice-flower''',usually grows to a height of  has green to yellowish involucral bracts and yellow flowers.

Distribution and habitat
Diosma rice-flower (subsp. dichotoma) grows in sand or heavier soil, often in mallee shrubland and occurs from the Eyre Peninsula in South Australia to near West Wyalong in New South Wales and to the Grampians in Victoria. Yellow rice-flower (subsp. flava) mainly grows in sandy soil and is found from the Yorke Peninsula in South Australia to East Gippsland in Victoria and from the south-east to the north of Tasmania.

Conservation status
Yellow rice-flower is listed as "rare" in Tasmania under the Tasmanian Government Threatened Species Protection Act 1995''.

References

flava
Flora of New South Wales
Flora of Tasmania
Flora of South Australia
Flora of Victoria (Australia)
Malvales of Australia
Plants described in 1810
Taxa named by Robert Brown (botanist, born 1773)